Robert Garfield (born c. 1955) is an American journalist and commentator, and the host of Bully Pulpit from Booksmart Studios. He is former co-host of On the Media from WNYC. He is also the host of The Genius Dialogues from Audible. Until 2010, he wrote the "Ad Review" TV-commercial criticism feature in Advertising Age. From 1986 to 1999, Garfield was a roving correspondent for All Things Considered and was a longtime advertising analyst for ABC News.

Career
Garfield began his career as a reporter for the Reading Times from 1977 to 1981. He has been a columnist for USA Today and contributing editor for Civilization and The Washington Post magazine. He wrote the "AdReview" column in Advertising Age from 1985 to 2010. He has also written for The New York Times, Playboy, Sports Illustrated, Wired, and many other publications.

A collection of his work, titled Waking Up Screaming from the American Dream, was published by Scribner's in 1997. A second book, And Now a Few Words from Me, appeared in 2003. Garfield co-wrote "Tag, You're It", a country song performed on NPR by Willie Nelson, and wrote an episode of the situation comedy Sweet Surrender. In 2009, he published a book about the collapse of the media landscape called The Chaos Scenario. His first novel, Bedfellows, was published in October 2012. In 2013, he co-authored a non-fiction book with Doug Levy called Can't Buy Me Like.

In October 2007, Garfield launched Comcast Must Die (no longer updated) as a customer-service platform of last resort for disgruntled Comcast subscribers.

Garfield co-hosted the radio program and podcast On the Media with Brooke Gladstone from 2001 until 2021. It covers journalism and media criticism. He also hosts the podcast The Genius Dialogues, presented by Audible Inc., in which he interviews winners of the MacArthur Fellows Program (often called "Genius Grants").

In 2012, Garfield co-founded a podcast about the English language called Lexicon Valley, presented by Slate, with producer Mike Vuolo. In the January 2, 2013 episode on "creaky voice" in young females, Garfield criticized the phenomenon in emphatic terms. The episode was the most listened to by a factor of ten and brought strong disapproval on Garfield from some sources. Garfield and Vuolo hosted the podcast until 2016, when both left the podcast to pursue other projects.

In 2015, Garfield founded the Media Future Summit at Wharton, an annual gathering of high-level executives, owners and academics aimed at addressing the flailing media economy. He is a senior fellow at the Wharton Future of Advertising Program, SEI Center for Advanced Studies in Management at the University of Pennsylvania. He has been a Professor of Practice at Penn and a Distinguished Visiting Faculty in Media Ecology at Berlin School of Creative Leadership.

In 2021, New York Public Radio fired Garfield, saying he had violated the station's anti-bullying policy. Station officials cited a pattern of behavior uncovered by an independent investigator. Station management issued Garfield a warning in 2020 but the behavior persisted, officials said. Garfield said the behavior amounted to two instances of yelling at meetings, in both cases as a response to "provocation [that] was extraordinary and simply shocking".

Personal life
Garfield was raised in a Jewish family in Bala Cynwyd, Pennsylvania, "a hometown of my youth". He lives in Potomac, Maryland. He is married to Milena Trobozić; they have three daughters.

Works 
 Waking Up Screaming from the American Dream, Scribner's, 1997. 
 And Now a Few Words from Me: advertising's leading critic lays down the law, once and for all New York ; London : McGraw-Hill, 2003. 
 The Chaos Scenario. Nashville, Tenn.: Stielstra Publishing, 2009. 
 Bedfellows, Las Vegas, NV : Thomas & Mercer, 2012.  
 Doug Levy, Can't Buy Me Like, Portfolio, 2013. 
 American Manifesto: Saving Democracy from Villains, Vandals, and Ourselves, Berkeley, California: Counterpoint, 2020.

Honors and awards
In 1997, Garfield's "Ad Review" won a Jesse H. Neal Award for best column.

Garfield's work with On the Media has won several awards. In 2003, he received the National Press Club’s Arthur Rowse Award for Media Criticism in Best Body of Work, TV and Radio and an Edward R. Murrow Award from the Radio Television Digital News Association for investigative journalism. In 2004, On the Media won a Peabody Award for excellence. In both 2012 and 2013, the show won the 2012 Bart Richards Award for Media Criticism from the College of Communications at Penn State. In 2015, he won a Mirror Award for Best Single Story for the On the Media episode "OTM Goes Inside Washington."

References

External links
 BobGarfield.net - Bob Garfield's hub site
 Advertising Age - Bob Garfield: The Blog
 People - Bob Garfield - On The Media
 In depth interview with Bob Garfield on truth in marketing
 https://web.archive.org/web/20080511172622/http://comcastmustdie.com/
 "The Revolution Will Not Be Monetized: Stratospheric valuations for social media titans assume vast advertising revenues that will never arrive," by Bob Garfield, IEEE Spectrum, June 2011

1950s births
Living people
American male journalists
NPR personalities
Jewish American writers
Place of birth missing (living people)
21st-century American novelists
American male novelists
Jewish American journalists
21st-century American male writers
21st-century American non-fiction writers
21st-century American Jews